Ihnen is a surname. Notable people with the surname include:

 Ulla Ihnen (born 1956), German politician
 Wiard Ihnen (1897–1979), American art director